André Racicot, Jr., (born June 9, 1969) is a Canadian former professional ice hockey goaltender, most famous for his time with the Montreal Canadiens with whom he won the 1993 Stanley Cup.

Career
Racicot started his National Hockey League (NHL) career in 1989 with the Montreal Canadiens. He had been selected in the 4th round, 83rd overall, of the 1989 NHL Entry Draft following a successful career in the Quebec Major Junior Hockey League with the Granby Bisons.

Montreal already had established first team duo Patrick Roy and Brian Hayward who had won three William M. Jennings Trophy in a row from 1986 to 1989. As a result, Racicot's first season was spent largely on the Sherbrooke Canadiens farm team, but he finally made his NHL debut on December 9, 1989, against the Toronto Maple Leafs, when he allowed three goals on six shots in just less than 13 minutes before being replaced. It was his only NHL appearance of the 1989–90 NHL season. He shared the Harry "Hap" Holmes Memorial Award for fewest goals allowed in the AHL in 1990 with fellow understudy Jean-Claude Bergeron.

The 1990–91 season saw regular understudy Hayward's traded to the Minnesota North Stars. As a result, Racicot split time with the Fredericton Canadiens and Montreal, as he battled with Jean-Claude Bergeron and Frédéric Chabot for second string duties.

The following 1991–92 season saw Roland Melanson brought in as an experienced backup, reducing Racicot's opportunities significantly as he again spent a large portion of the season with Federicton. In his 9 appearances for Montreal he was winless, while Roy appeared in 67 games to earn another Jennings Trophy.

In 1992-93 Racicot had his most successful season for Montreal. While Roy appeared in the majority of games (62 of the 84 possible) Racicot saw action in 26 games, winning 17. The Canadiens made their way to the Stanley Cup Final. Racicot saw only 18 minutes of action in the playoffs as Roy backstopped the unfancied Montreal to their first Stanley Cup win since 1986.

The following year Racicot again faced competition for his second string position, with Ron Tugnutt and Les Kuntar splitting playing time. His performances dipped, and ultimately he was released at the end of the 1994 season.

Racicot left the NHL after the 1994 season, spending several seasons with various teams in the AHL, International Hockey League, and East Coast Hockey League. The 1999–2000 season saw Racicot move to Russia, playing in 20 games with HC Neftekhimik Nizhnekamsk before returning to North America for another five seasons of minor-pro hockey. He retired as a player in 2004.

Nickname
Racicot earned the infamous nickname "Red Light" following early performances with Montreal. Claims as to its origin are disputed. Stories allege it was given by a journalist Red Fisher following his disappointing debut that saw him concede 3 in 6 shots before being pulled. Others have attributed it to Don Cherry.

Career statistics

Regular season and playoffs

References

External links

1969 births
Living people
Albany River Rats players
Canadian ice hockey goaltenders
Granby Bisons players
HC Neftekhimik Nizhnekamsk players
Sportspeople from Rouyn-Noranda
Kansas City Blades players
Longueuil Chevaliers players
Montreal Canadiens draft picks
Montreal Canadiens players
Phoenix Roadrunners (IHL) players
Stanley Cup champions
Ice hockey people from Quebec
Canadian expatriate ice hockey players in Russia